Villefort may refer to:

Places 
Villefort, Aude, France
Villefort, Lozère, France

People 
 Danillo Villefort (born 1983), Brazilian mixed martial artist
 Yuri Villefort (born 1991), Brazilian mixed martial artist

Other uses 
 Gérard de Villefort, Deputy Crown Prosecutor in Alexandre Dumas' novel The Count of Monte Cristo